Darren Charles Waller (born September 13, 1992) is an American football tight end for the New York Giants of the National Football League (NFL). He played college football at Georgia Tech and was drafted by the Baltimore Ravens in the sixth round of the 2015 NFL Draft. He is the great-grandson of composer and jazz pianist Fats Waller.

Early life
Darren Waller was born in Landover, Maryland, to Dorian and Charlena Waller. He has a sister, Deanna. He was raised in Colorado Springs, Colorado, Marietta, Georgia, and Acworth, Georgia. Darren Waller's great-grandfather was jazz musician Fats Waller. Darren produces hip-hop music in his spare time.

College career
Waller attended and played college football at Georgia Tech as a wide receiver where he redshirted his freshman season of 2011 and decided to forgo his final year of eligibility by entering the 2015 NFL Draft.

Collegiate statistics

Professional career

Baltimore Ravens
The Baltimore Ravens selected Waller in the sixth round with the 204th overall pick in the 2015 NFL Draft. The selection was acquired in a trade in exchange for Rolando McClain. Waller became the 27th wide receiver drafted in 2015. On May 7, 2015, the Baltimore Ravens signed Waller to a four-year, $2.39 million contract that included a signing bonus of $104,732.

2015

Throughout training camp, Waller competed for a roster spot as a backup wide receiver against Marlon Brown, Michael Campanaro, and Kamar Aiken. Head coach John Harbaugh named Waller the sixth wide receiver on the depth chart to begin his rookie season, behind Steve Smith Sr., Kamar Aiken, Michael Campanaro, Marlon Brown, and Breshad Perriman.

On October 29, 2015, Waller was placed on the injured reserve list, ending his season.

2016

On July 1, 2016, Waller was suspended for the first four games of the 2016 NFL season for violating the league's substance-abuse policy.

2017

On June 30, 2017, Waller was suspended for one year without pay for again violating the substance-abuse policy.

2018

On August 7, 2018, Waller was reinstated by the league after completing a rehabilitation program at Borden Cottage and serving his year-long suspension. He was waived on September 1, 2018, and was signed to the practice squad the next day.

Oakland / Las Vegas Raiders

2018

On November 26, 2018, Waller was signed by the Oakland Raiders off the Ravens' practice squad. During the 2018 season, he appeared in four games and had six receptions for 75 yards.

2019

On Hard Knocks with the Raiders, he was featured in an episode detailing his struggle with substance abuse and his steps taken to overcome it. In Week 1 of the 2019 season against the Denver Broncos, Waller caught seven passes for 70 yards in the 24–16 win. During Week 3 against the Minnesota Vikings, Waller finished with 134 receiving yards on 13 receptions, marking his first career game with over 100 yards, but the Raiders lost 34–14. On October 16, 2019, Waller signed a three-year contract extension with the Raiders through the 2023 season. In Week 7 against the Green Bay Packers, Waller caught seven passes for 126 yards and two touchdowns in the 42–24 loss. In Week 13 against the Kansas City Chiefs, Waller caught seven passes for 100 yards in the 40–9 loss. In Week 14 against the Tennessee Titans, he caught seven passes for 63 yards in a 42–21 loss. During Week 15 against the Jacksonville Jaguars, Waller finished with eight catches for 122 receiving yards as the Raiders lost 20–16. In Week 17 against the Denver Broncos, Waller caught six passes for 107 yards, including a 75-yard catch, during the 16–15 loss. Waller was named as an alternate to the 2020 Pro Bowl, and after the Kansas City Chiefs advanced to the Super Bowl, he was originally supposed to be named in as a replacement for Travis Kelce, but he had recently had thumb surgery and was unable to play. Jack Doyle was instead named as Kelce's alternate. Waller finished the 2019 season with 90 receptions for 1,145 yards and three touchdowns. He was ranked 99th by his fellow players on the NFL Top 100 Players of 2020.

2020

In Week 2 of the 2020 season against the New Orleans Saints on Monday Night Football, he had 12 receptions for 103 receiving yards and one receiving touchdown in the 34–24 victory. He was fined $30,000 by the NFL on October 5, 2020, for hosting a maskless charity event during the COVID-19 pandemic in violation of the NFL's COVID-19 protocols for the 2020 season. In Week 13 against the New York Jets, Waller had 13 receptions for 200 receiving yards, establishing a new Raiders franchise record for a tight end, while also scoring two touchdowns in a 31–28 win. In Week 15 against the Los Angeles Chargers on Thursday Night Football, Waller had nine receptions for 150 yards and a touchdown during the 30–27 overtime loss. In Week 16 against the Miami Dolphins, Waller recorded 5 catches for 112 yards during the 26–25 loss. In Week 17 against the Denver Broncos, Waller recorded nine catches for 117 yards and a touchdown as well as catching the game winning two-point conversion attempt late in the fourth quarter to secure a 32–31 win for the Raiders.
For the 2020 season, Waller established career highs in receptions (107), receiving yards (1,196) and touchdowns (9). His 107 receptions ranked fourth in the NFL and first among tight ends, while his yardage ranked tenth overall and second among tight ends (behind Travis Kelce's 1,416 yards). He was named to the Pro Bowl for the first time. He was ranked 35th by his fellow players on the NFL Top 100 Players of 2021.

2021

In the 2021 regular season opener, Waller had ten receptions for 105 receiving yards and a touchdown in the 33–27 overtime victory over the Baltimore Ravens. In Week 11, against the Cincinnati Bengals, he had seven receptions for 116 yards. He finished the 2021 season with 55 receptions for 665 receiving yards and two receiving touchdowns in 11 games. He was ranked 58th by his fellow players on the NFL Top 100 Players of 2022.

2022

On September 10, 2022, Waller signed a three-year, $51 million contract extension with the Raiders, becoming the highest-paid tight end in the league. He was placed on injured reserve on November 10, 2022. He was activated on December 17.

New York Giants

2023

On March 15, 2023, Waller was traded to the New York Giants for a third-round pick.

Personal life
Waller began abusing oxycodone at 15 years old and drinking alcohol at 16 years old. His oxycodone addiction escalated to the point that he was eventually spending $100 per day on pills. Later in life, he began using "a lot of" cocaine. On August 11, 2017, in Maryland, he overdosed on pills while sitting in his parked Jeep. After spending 34 days in a substance abuse rehabilitation program in Camden, Maine, he took a job stocking shelves at a Sprouts Farmers Market.

Waller founded the Darren Waller Foundation in 2020 to "equip youth to avoid and overcome addiction to drugs and alcohol and support youth and their families during their recovery and treatment journey."

On March 4, 2023, Waller married Las Vegas Aces point guard Kelsey Plum.

NFL career statistics

References

External links

Las Vegas Raiders bio
Georgia Tech Yellow Jackets bio

1992 births
Living people
American football tight ends
American football wide receivers
Baltimore Ravens players
Georgia Tech Yellow Jackets football players
Las Vegas Raiders players
New York Giants players
Oakland Raiders players
Players of American football from Georgia (U.S. state)
Sportspeople from Cobb County, Georgia
American Conference Pro Bowl players